Kakhakn is a village in the Vardenis Municipality of the Gegharkunik Province of Armenia.

History 
The village has 13th-16th century khachkars.

Gallery

References

External links 

Populated places in Gegharkunik Province